York Middle/High School is a public high school located in the Hamlet of Retsof, Livingston County, New York, United States, and is the only high school operated by the York Central School District.

Footnotes

Schools in Livingston County, New York
Public high schools in New York (state)